Pungence is a very rare term no longer found in most dictionaries. It may refer to
 pungency of food ("spiciness", "hotness")
 pointedness of a leaf ("pungent leaf")